SAIB or Saib or Saïb may refer to:

 Sucrose acetate isobutyrate, an emulsifier, used as an additive in food and cosmetics 
 Swedish Accident Investigation Board, now the Swedish Accident Investigation Authority
 Swiss Accident Investigation Board, now the Swiss Transportation Safety Investigation Board

People
Saib is an Arabic male given name
 Saib Tabrizi (1601/2–1677), Persian poet
 Saib Shawkat, Arab nationalist in the 20th century 
 Moussa Saïb (born 1969), Algerian football manager and former player